The 2007 Campeonato Argentino de Rugby  was won by the selection of the U.R.B.A. (Buenos Aires) that beat in the final the selection of Unión de Rugby de Tucumàn
The 24 teams participating were divided in two levels : "Campeonato" (8 teams), "Ascenso", (16 teams, divided in four pools)

"Campeonato" 
Team participating divided in due pools of 4. The first two of each pool admitted to semifinals, the last to play-out for relegation ("Finale descenso")

Pool 1

Pool 2

Play-offs (Title)

Play Out (relegation) 

Relegated:  San Juan

"Torneo Ascenso" 

16 teams, divided in 4 pools. Le winner of each pool to the semifinals

Pool "Norte 1" 

 Ranking:

Pool "Norte 2"

Pool "Sur 1"

Pool "Sur 2"

Semifinals

Final 

Promoted: Mar del Plata

External links 
  Memorias de la UAR 2007
  Francesco Volpe, Paolo Pacitti (Author), Rugby 2008, GTE Gruppo Editorale (2007)

Campeonato Argentino de Rugby
Argentina